Jules Moriceau (2 January 1887, in Nantes – 20 June 1977, in Garches) was a French racecar driver.

Indy 500 results

References

French racing drivers
Indianapolis 500 drivers
1887 births
1977 deaths
24 Hours of Le Mans drivers